Clarence Clyde Seedorf (born 1 April 1976) is a Dutch professional football manager and former player. He is regarded by many to be one of the best midfielders of his generation.

Seedorf is considered one of the most successful players in UEFA Champions League history, as he is the only player to have won the Champions League with three clubs – once with Ajax, in 1995, once with Real Madrid, in 1998 and twice with AC Milan, in 2003 and 2007.

At international level, he represented the Netherlands on 87 occasions, and took part in three UEFA European Football Championships (1996, 2000, 2004) and the 1998 FIFA World Cup, reaching the semi-finals of the latter three tournaments.

In 2004, he was chosen by Pelé as part of the FIFA 100. Seedorf is one of the most decorated Dutch players ever, and has won domestic and continental titles while playing for clubs in the Netherlands, Spain, Italy and Brazil.

Early career
Born in Paramaribo, Suriname, Seedorf was raised as Christian in Almere, Flevoland, where he moved when he was two years old. He grew up in a footballing family, with both his younger brothers Jürgen and Chedric Seedorf, and his father, former player and talent agent Johann Seedorf.

Seedorf began his career at the age of six in the youth ranks of his local amateur sides VV AS '80 and Real Almere, before being discovered and recruited to the ranks of nearby Dutch giants Ajax by Urgent Scoutingteam, the talent agency set up by Johan Cruyff, and which was responsible for recruiting the likes of Frank and Ronald de Boer, Edgar Davids, Robert Witschge and Patrick Kluivert to the club as well.

Following in their brother's footsteps, under the guidance of their father and talent agent, Seedorf's siblings, as well as cousin Stefano, would later also join the ranks of Ajax.

Club career

Ajax
A product of the famed Ajax Youth Academy, Seedorf started his career as a right midfielder for Ajax during the early 1990s. He made his professional debut on 29 November 1992 against Groningen at the age of 16 years and 242 days, making him the youngest-ever debutant for Ajax, at the time. He quickly established himself as the first choice on his position under manager Louis van Gaal, and in the 1993–94 season, his second with the club, he helped the Amsterdam-based side win the treble, securing the Eredivisie title, the KNVB Cup and the Dutch Super Cup in the same year. Among his teammates was Frank Rijkaard, the player he used to idolise in his younger days.

The following season saw Master Seedorf help his side secure consecutive Super Cup and Eredivisie titles, as well as help his side to their fourth European Cup trophy, winning the 1994–95 UEFA Champions League after defeating AC Milan in the final. He played a key role in the final before being replaced in the 53rd minute by striker Nwankwo Kanu. Patrick Kluivert scored a late goal to lift Ajax to a 1–0 victory over the Italian giants, who Seedorf would later go on to represent for a decade. While at Ajax, he was part of a trio known as "De kabel", composed of Edgar Davids, Patrick Kluivert and himself. Later, Winston Bogarde and Michael Reiziger would be added to the group to make it a quintet; what had started as a friendship was then taken over during the UEFA Euro 1996 to describe the group.

Sampdoria
Opting not to extend his contract with Ajax following their European success and the Bosman ruling, Seedorf signed a one-year contract with Italian Serie A side Sampdoria instead. While not able to obtain any silverware in his first season at his new club, Seedorf appeared in 32 matches, scoring three goals helping his side to an eighth-place finish in the league table, all the while maintaining the form he had demonstrated at Ajax in the past. Seedorf was then able to secure a transfer to Real Madrid, moving to the Spanish La Liga by the end of the season.

Real Madrid
Seedorf moved to Real Madrid in 1996, where he was virtually ever present for Los Blancos in his first three seasons. In his first season, he helped the team regain the La Liga title, while in his second season, 1997–98, he played a major role in the team's Champions League success, as Madrid secured a 1–0 victory over Juventus in the final, earning his second Champions League title of his career.

While playing for Real Madrid, Seedorf scored a notable long-range goal against Atlético Madrid in 1997.
At the end of the 1998–99 season, Madrid and Juventus wanted to swap Seedorf for Zinedine Zidane, but the deal did not go through and the French playmaker waited two more years before joining Real Madrid.

Starting from the summer of 1999, Seedorf's role at Real Madrid became less prominent during the tenure of Dutch manager Guus Hiddink at the club. He was eventually transferred back to Italy during the 1999–2000 season, this time to Inter Milan, for a fee about 44 billion Italian lira (approximately €23 million).

Inter Milan
On 24 December 1999, Seedorf moved to Inter in a $24.35 million deal after cementing his place in the Real Madrid midfield for over three years. Despite helping the team to the Coppa Italia final later that season – a 2–1 aggregate loss to Lazio where Seedorf scored Inter's only goal – Seedorf could not help bring any major silverware to the club. Nonetheless, he is remembered by many Inter fans for his two goals against Juventus in a 2–2 draw on 9 March 2002, both of which were superb long-range efforts.

AC Milan

After two years with Inter, Seedorf moved to their city rivals AC Milan in 2002, in an exchange with Francesco Coco. Seedorf won the Coppa Italia with Milan in 2003, the first time they had won the competition in 26 years. In the same season, Seedorf gained his third Champions League medal, becoming the first player to win the Champions League with three clubs. The all-Italian final saw Milan beat Juventus on penalties after a 0–0 draw, despite Seedorf failing to convert his own penalty. The following season, 2003–04, Seedorf played a role in the Milan side that won the Serie A title. It was Seedorf's fourth national league title of his career, following his two Dutch title wins with Ajax and his one Spanish win with Real Madrid.

Seedorf played a major role as Milan reached the Champions League final again in 2005, scoring the only goal of the game in their opening group match against Shakhtar Donetsk on 14 September 2004 and appearing in all 13 competition matches. He started the match against Liverpool in Istanbul in which Milan lost a 3–0 lead, eventually losing on penalties after a 3–3 draw; Seedorf did not take a penalty-kick. Milan also finished runners-up in the Serie A, seven points behind champions Juventus, although Juventus were stripped of the title and Milan docked points for match-fixing.

A match-fixing scandal tarnished Serie A and Milan were weakened by the scandal but were allowed to continue in Europe the following season, which led to their top players remaining with the club. In that season, 2005–06, he scored a goal after just 25 seconds in a 2–2 draw against Schalke.

Seedorf's role as foil to midfielder Kaká became increasingly impressive as the pair combined in style to score and supply the goals which drove Milan past Bayern Munich and Manchester United to another Champions League final, again against Liverpool. This time, however, they defeated them 2–1 in Athens, with Seedorf collecting his fourth Champions League medal. In that same year, Seedorf was a part of the Milan squad that won the 2007 FIFA Club World Cup, becoming the first European player to win the trophy with three clubs (Ajax in 1995 and Real Madrid in 1998). He ended up winning the Silver Ball for the competition for his performances, notably scoring the winner against Urawa Red Diamonds in the semi final to send his club to the final.

At the end of the 2006–07 season, Seedorf was voted best midfielder of the Champions League. He played his 100th game in the Champions League on 4 December against Celtic.

With Milan, Seedorf formed a formidable midfield partnership with Gennaro Gattuso and Andrea Pirlo, which began since the 2002–03 season. This midfield trio was still used in the starting line-up until the 2011–12 season (Pirlo left the Rossoneri in the summer of 2011), although their form had been declining. Under the guidance of coach Carlo Ancelotti, their role was to support an attacking midfielder, whether it be Rivaldo, Rui Costa, Kaká or Ronaldinho.

Seedorf became the foreigner with the most appearances for Milan following a game against his former club, Sampdoria, which he scored in. At 395 appearances, he passed Nils Liedholm for this historic milestone. During the Sampdoria game, he also became the ninth-highest scoring foreigner for Milan, with 58 goals.
On 29 March 2010, Seedorf was the target of racist chants from Lazio fans in a 1–1 draw, which led to the Rome-based club being given a €15,000 fine by the Italian Football Federation (FIGC). This led the Italy's players' union want racism stamped out in Serie A.

Seedorf won his second Scudetto with Milan in the 2010–11 Serie A season, where he once again played a vital role. He scored four goals and made 36 appearances in the 2010–11 season.
Seedorf added yet another medal to his trophy cabinet in the first official game of the 2011–12 season, where he played the full 90 minutes in a 2–1 comeback win over rivals Inter Milan in the Supercoppa Italiana. He scored the winning goal of Milan's first win of the 2011–12 Serie A campaign, a 1–0 defeat of Cesena on 24 September.

Seedorf was ranked seventh of the 20 best players of the Champions League, a list which was compiled in 2012 to commemorate the 20th anniversary of the competition. The ranking was done by Champions, the official magazine of UEFA. On 14 May, he said that he was playing his last match with Milan against Novara that day. He also confirmed that he would continue to play football for another club. On 21 June, Seedorf held a press conference announcing his departure from Milan, stating, "I am leaving after 10 wonderful years... I leave a family" after playing for the Rossoneri for a decade and winning two Champions League, two Scudettos and a Coppa Italia. Club CEO Adriano Galliani spoke of Seedorf following the player's departure in the highest regard, stating, "When Milan played well, which happened often, each and every time it occurred Seedorf played an amazing match. He is a world class player."

Botafogo

On 30 June 2012, Seedorf signed a two-year contract with Brazilian club Botafogo. The veteran midfielder made his debut with the club on 22 July against Grêmio. On 5 August, Seedorf scored his first goal for Botafogo, curling in a free kick against Atlético Goianiense. On 5 September, Seedorf scored two goals and made an assist against Cruzeiro, helping Botafogo to a 3–1 victory. On 3 February 2013, for the first time on his career, Seedorf scored a hat-trick against Macaé, his first game as a starter that year. Before that game, Seedorf played the second half against Fluminense and made a good assist to Bolívar, who scored the match's equalizer.

On 10 March 2013, Seedorf won his first title with Botafogo: the 2013 Taça Guanabara, the first round of 2013 Campeonato Carioca. On 5 May, he won the second round of 2013 Campeonato Carioca – 2013 Taça Rio – against Fluminense. That is also the day of his first official title for Botafogo, the 2013 Campeonato Carioca, as the team won both rounds and no final match was needed. On 6 June, Seedorf scored his 100th goal in domestic league play: 11 with Ajax, 3 with Sampdoria, 15 with Real Madrid, 8 with Inter, 47 with Milan and 16 with Botafogo. On 14 January 2014, Seedorf announced his retirement from professional football. He announced that he is ending his playing career to take up the manager position at Milan following the sacking of Massimiliano Allegri.

International career
Due to Surinamese rules against dual citizenship, players who take Dutch citizenship are no longer eligible to represent the Netherlands' former colony. He received his first callup on 14 December 1994 at the age of 18 against Luxembourg. Seedorf scored on his debut, helping his team to a 5–0 victory in a UEFA Euro 1996 qualifying match.

Seedorf was in the Dutch squad for the UEFA European Championships in 1996, where his penalty miss proved decisive in the quarter-final shootout defeat to France. He also appeared for the Netherlands at Euro 2000 and 2004, as well as the 1998 FIFA World Cup, reaching the semi-finals in all three of these tournaments.

On 12 November 2006, Seedorf was recalled for the first time since June 2004 as a replacement for the injured Wesley Sneijder. He started and played the full 90 minutes in a 1–1 friendly draw against England. Seedorf won the last of his 87 caps for the Netherlands in 2007. In the Euro 2008 qualifiers against Romania (0–0 at home) and Slovenia (1–0 away win), Seedorf played four and six minutes respectively. There were doubts on his position within the national team, as Marco van Basten favoured younger players such as Rafael van der Vaart, Wesley Sneijder and Robin van Persie. On 13 May 2008, Seedorf announced that he would not take part in UEFA Euro 2008 due to his ongoing personal conflict with van Basten.

Style of play

Nicknamed “Il Professore” and “Willy Wonka”, Seedorf was a well-rounded, hardworking and versatile player, who was gifted with strength, pace, stamina and notable physical attributes, which allowed him to play anywhere in midfield and contribute both offensively and defensively, due to his significant tactical intelligence; although he primarily served as a playmaker in the centre, throughout his career he was also deployed as an attacking midfielder, on the wing, as a mezzala, or in a holding or box-to-box role.

A world class midfielder, in addition to his fitness and athletic characteristics, as well as his ability to break down opposing plays and win back possession, he was an elegant, creative player and an excellent dribbler, possessing outstanding technique, ball skills and vision, which enabled him to retain possession when under pressure and subsequently lay the ball off to an on-rushing teammate; he was also an accurate passer and crosser of the ball. Seedorf was also capable of scoring goals due to his powerful, accurate striking ability from distance with either foot; furthermore, he was an effective free kick taker. Despite his physical, energetic, and tenacious style of play, Seedorf was regarded as a correct player, and was sent off only two times in his entire career. In addition to his success and footballing skills, Seedorf has also been praised for his longevity as a footballer.

Managerial career
Seedorf was appointed the new head coach of Milan on 16 January 2014, terminating his contract with Botafogo early in order to take on the managerial role, with Milan languishing in 11th in the Serie A table. On 19 January, he won his first managerial match, played against Hellas Verona, with Mario Balotelli scoring the lone goal of the game.

Despite overseeing the club's first five-match winning run since 2011, and first Serie A victory in the Milan derby against Inter since 2011, Seedorf was dismissed by Milan on 9 June 2014 after just four months on the job, with Filippo Inzaghi being named as his successor. During the Dutchman's time at the helm of the club, Milan gained a total of 35 out of a possible 57 points - the fourth-most out of all Serie A sides (one less than Napoli's corresponding total and six less than Roma's).

Seedorf was appointed manager of China League One team Shenzhen F.C. in July 2016, but was replaced five months later by Sven-Göran Eriksson. A year later Seedorf joined Brazilian club Atlético Paranaense as both a coach and a sporting director Within a month the deal was cancelled after both parties failed to reach an agreement. In February 2018, Seedorf was appointed as manager of Spanish club Deportivo de La Coruña for the remainder of the 2017–18 season. Seedorf led the team to just two wins in sixteen matches, Deportivo were relegated from La Liga, and at the end of the season he left the club.

After a deal with Sven-Göran Eriksson could not be agreed, the Fédération Camerounaise de Football appointed Seedorf as the manager of the Cameroon national team in August 2018. He was joined by former teammate Patrick Kluivert as his assistant manager. However, after a disappointing 2019 Africa Cup of Nations, where Cameroon was eliminated by Nigeria in the round of sixteen after an unimpressive group stage, he was sacked in July 2019.

Personal life and other work
 
Seedorf speaks six languages fluently: Dutch, English, Italian, Portuguese, Spanish and Sranan Tongo. He was often seen as a spiritual, intelligent and articulate figure in football, and in a 2011 interview, Seedorf stated that he was studying to obtain a master's degree in business at the prestigious Bocconi University in Milan; because of this, he earned the nickname "il professore" ("the professor") during his time playing at Milan. Seedorf is married to a Brazilian woman, Luviana Seedorf, with whom he owns a restaurant called Finger's in Milan. They have four children. The relationship is rumored to have been ended around 2018, with Seedorf finding a new partner, Sophia Makramati, a Canadian citizen of Iranian descent and Muslim religious background. On 4 March 2022, Seedorf announced on Instagram that he had converted to Islam in Abu Dhabi.

Seedorf has dabbled in media-related work during recent years. In 2009, he worked with The New York Times to run a column entitled "Seedorf responds", where once a month he would answer peoples' questions regarding football. He joined the BBC's team covering the 2010 FIFA World Cup in South Africa, working as a television pundit. He also presented a number of features for the BBC coverage, including one about Robben Island. He joined the BBC for their Match of the Day Live coverage of UEFA Euro 2012. He has also made appearances on Match of the Day 2 during the English football league season.

Because of his strong connection with the country Suriname, where he was born, he is involved in many social development projects there. He built his own "Clarence Seedorf Stadium" in the district of Para in Suriname. In this stadium, the Para Juniors League of Suriname is being held and the teams of the Suri Profs & SV The Brothers play there regularly. With his Champions for Children Foundation, he supports projects for good causes in Suriname. For this, Suriname has honoured him to Commandor of the High-Order of the Yellow Star, and recently in 2011, he was invested as a Knight of the Order of Orange-Nassau (OON).

On 5 June 2009, Seedorf announced at a press conference after a meeting with Nelson Mandela that he had become the Nelson Mandela Foundation's latest Legacy Champion. He joins Patrice Motsepe, Tokyo Sexwale, David Rockefeller, Peggy Dulany and Bill Clinton, who are also members of a select group of philanthropists who are helping to ensure that Mr. Mandela's legacy lives on.

In 2012 and 2014, Seedorf took part in Soccer Aid, a charity match at Old Trafford with former professional players and celebrities. He played for "The Rest of the World" team against England. In 2014, he scored a hat-trick, where The Rest of the World won 4–2; they raised over £4 million in total.

Clarence's nephew, Collin Seedorf, is also a professional footballer, and currently plays for Dutch club, FC Eindhoven.

Career statistics

Club

International

Scores and results list the Netherlands' goal tally first, score column indicates score after each Seedorf goal.

Managerial statistics

Honours

Player
Ajax
 Eredivisie: 1993–94, 1994–95
 KNVB Cup: 1992–93
 Johan Cruijff Shield: 1993
 UEFA Champions League: 1994–95

Real Madrid
 La Liga: 1996–97
 Supercopa de España: 1997
 UEFA Champions League: 1997–98
 Intercontinental Cup: 1998

AC Milan
 Serie A: 2003–04, 2010–11
 Coppa Italia: 2002–03
 Supercoppa Italiana: 2011
 UEFA Champions League: 2002–03, 2006–07
 UEFA Super Cup: 2003, 2007	
 FIFA Club World Cup: 2007

Botafogo
Campeonato Carioca: 2013
Individual
 Dutch Football Talent of the Year: 1993, 1994 
ESM Team of the Year: 1996–97
 UEFA Team of the Year: 2002, 2007
 UEFA Best Midfielder Award: 2006–07 
 FIFA Club World Cup Silver Ball: 2007 
 FIFPro World XI Nominee: 2007
 Real Madrid Team of the Century: 2008
 Bola de Prata: 2013
 Knight of the Order of Orange-Nassau
 Commander of the Honorary Order of the Yellow Star
 Nelson Mandela Legacy Champion
 FIFA 100
 AC Milan Hall of Fame
 Golden Foot Award Legends: 2018

See also 
 List of footballers with 100 or more UEFA Champions League appearances
 List of men's footballers with the most official appearances
 List of people named in the Panama Papers

References

External links

 Clarence Seedorf official website
 

1976 births
Living people
Clarence
Sportspeople from Paramaribo
Footballers from Almere
Dutch footballers
Dutch football managers
Netherlands international footballers
Surinamese footballers
Surinamese football managers
Surinamese emigrants to the Netherlands
Association football midfielders
AFC Ajax players
U.C. Sampdoria players
Real Madrid CF players
Inter Milan players
A.C. Milan players
Botafogo de Futebol e Regatas players
Eredivisie players
Serie A players
La Liga players
Campeonato Brasileiro Série A players
UEFA Champions League winning players
UEFA Euro 1996 players
1998 FIFA World Cup players
UEFA Euro 2000 players
UEFA Euro 2004 players
FIFA 100
Dutch expatriate footballers
Surinamese expatriate footballers
Dutch expatriate sportspeople in Italy
Dutch expatriate sportspeople in Spain
Dutch expatriate sportspeople in Brazil
Dutch Muslims
Expatriate footballers in Italy
Expatriate footballers in Spain
Expatriate footballers in Brazil
A.C. Milan managers
Shenzhen F.C. managers
Deportivo de La Coruña managers
Cameroon national football team managers
Serie A managers
China League One managers
La Liga managers
2019 Africa Cup of Nations managers
Dutch expatriate football managers
Dutch expatriate sportspeople in China
Dutch expatriate sportspeople in Cameroon
Expatriate football managers in Italy
Expatriate football managers in China
Expatriate football managers in Spain
Expatriate football managers in Cameroon
Knights of the Order of Orange-Nassau
Honorary Order of the Yellow Star
People named in the Panama Papers
Converts to Islam
Dutch sportspeople of Surinamese descent